EU competition commission may refer to:

European Union competition law
European Commissioner for Competition